Gregory Gymnasium is the 4,000-seat current home of the University of Texas Longhorn women's volleyball team, and former home of the Longhorn basketball and swimming teams.  The basketball teams moved out in 1977 to the Erwin Center. It also served as the home court for the Austin Aces of World Team Tennis from 2014 to 2015.

Originally built in 1930, the gym was named after its main advocate and planner, Thomas Watt Gregory. Gregory, an alumnus of the University, served on the University's Board of Regents and as United States Attorney General before the gym was built.

The gymnasium has undergone several renovations, and now consists of the original gym and a four-story annex that serves as a gymnasium with an indoor jogging track, basketball courts, racquetball and squash courts, an indoor rock-climbing wall, a moderately-sized weight room, and a cardiovascular exercise facility. All University students can use the gymnasium for free. The gymnasium is available at a low cost to university alumni and their spouses.

Attendance Record

References

External links
Gregory Gymnasium at UT Recreational Sports
Gregory Gymnasium at Texas Sports

College volleyball venues in the United States
Texas Longhorns
Basketball venues in Texas
Indoor arenas in Texas
Defunct college basketball venues in the United States
Sports venues in Austin, Texas
Texas Longhorns sports venues
Texas Longhorns basketball venues
Sports venues completed in 1930
University of Texas at Austin campus
Gyms in the United States
Swimming venues in Austin, Texas
Volleyball venues in Texas
World TeamTennis stadiums
1930 establishments in Texas